Julian Marcus Daang Trono (born September 16, 1997) is a Filipino actor, dancer, choreographer and media personality. He is a contract artist of VIVA Artists Agency.

Trono has since moved to VIVA Artist Agency and acts in a romantic pairing with Ella Cruz. He is a choreographer at Body Rock Dance Studio in Quezon City.

Filmography

Television

Films
September 2009 – Yaya and Angelina: The Spoiled Brat Movie (GMA Films, APT Entertainment)
October 2011 – Dance Boy (European Indie Film)
July 2013 – Purok 7 (Cinemalaya 2013) as Jeremy
August 2014 – Ronda (Cinemalaya 2014) as the titular character's child
June 2017 – Ang Pagsanib Kay Leah de la Cruz (VIVA Films, Kamikaze Pictures)
September 2017 – Fangirl Fanboy (VIVA Films, N2 Productions)
May 2018 – Squad Goals (VIVA Films) as Benj
September 2019 – Sanggano, Sanggago't Sanggwapo (VIVA Films) as young Andy

Awards and nominations

References

External links

 

1997 births
Living people
Filipino Roman Catholics
Filipino male television actors
People from Quezon City
Male actors from Metro Manila
Filipino male dancers
Filipino male child actors
GMA Network personalities
GMA Music artists
Viva Artists Agency
ABS-CBN personalities